Masterpiece is the second studio album by The Masters Apprentices, released in February 1970 on Columbia Records.

Background
The Masters Apprentices had been stockpiling tracks since they signed with EMI in 1969. 1969 began with The Masters Apprentices settling their new line-up and the Ford/Keays writing team hitting its stride, the band now moved to its best-remembered and most successful phase. The first EMI single, released in March 1969 was "Linda Linda" / "Merry-Go-Round" and was the beginning of a short but successful collaboration with New Zealand-born producer Howard Gable.

The second single, the rocky "5:10 Man", released in July, which peaked at No. 16 on the Go-Set Singles Chart and initiated a string of Top 20 hits. It was a deliberate move towards a heavier sound, as the band were keen to move away from the current bubblegum craze that their manager and producer wanted.

During this period, Ford/Keays struggled to write new material due to the band's hectic live performance schedule. In February 1970, the second LP Masterpiece was finally released. Although something of a hodgepodge—as Keays freely admits—it showed the band developing a much broader range. It included the singles "Linda Linda" and "5:10 Man". The title track, a live recording, provides a vivid aural snapshot of their live show during 1968, complete with the deafening screams of fans. The album also includes their own version of "St John's Wood", a track Ford and Keays wrote for Brisbane band The Sect, who had released it as a single on Columbia during the year.

Reception

The album's retrospective reviews have been mixed.  Allmusic's Richie Unterberger said "It's a respectable but oddly schizophrenic effort, finding them searching for an identity with competent forays into hard rock, early progressive rock, and poppy folk-rock, with orchestral instrumental links between many of the tracks adding to the confusion (as there's no concept driving the LP)."

When writing about the album in Freedom Train, Australian rock journalist Ian McFarlane was complimentary of several of the album's tracks, but said that "Linda, Linda" and "Piece Of Me" were "just plain bad".  "Part of the problem lays in the fact that the band are concerned with making the obligatory profound musical statement (the first side had all the tracks segued into one another in the manner of the Beatles' Sgt. Pepper's, each linked by a short orchestral piece). As a result the album comes over as all solemn and self consciously arty, and is totally overblown. "

Track listing
All songs written by Doug Ford and Jim Keays.

Personnel 

The Masters Apprentices
 Doug Ford – lead guitar, acoustic guitar, banjo, vocal
 Jim Keays – vocal, percussion
 Colin Burgess – drums, percussion, vocal
 Glenn Wheatley – bass, tambourine, marraccas, vocals

Other Musicians
 The Chiffons  - backing vocals on "5:10 Man"
 Gavin Webb  - bass guitar
 Peter Tilbrook  - guitars, bass

Production Team
 Producer – Howard Gable
 Engineers  - John Sayers, Roger Savage

Artwork
 Photography  - Allan Kleinman
 Cover Design  - Whaite & Emery

References 

General
  Note: limited preview for on-line version.
 
  Note: Archived [on-line] copy has limited functionality.
  Note: [on-line] version was established at White Room Electronic Publishing Pty Ltd in 2007 and was expanded from the 2002 edition. As from September 2010 the [on-line] version is no longer available.

Specific

1970 albums
The Masters Apprentices albums